Ann Margaret Jefferson,  (born 3 November 1949) is a British scholar of French literature. She was a fellow and tutor in French at New College, Oxford, from 1987 to 2015, and professor of French at the University of Oxford from 2006 to 2015.

Early life and education
Jefferson was born on 3 November 1949 to Antony and Eirlys Jefferson. She studied at St Anne's College, Oxford, graduating with a Bachelor of Arts (BA) degree in 1971: as per tradition, her BA was later promoted to a Master of Arts (MA) degree. She then moved to Wolfson College, Oxford, where she undertook postgraduate research and she completed her Doctor of Philosophy (DPhil) degree in 1976.

Academic career
From 1978 to 1982, Jefferson was a junior research fellow at St John's College, Oxford. Then, from 1982 to 1987, she was a college lecturer at St John's College. In 1987, she was elected a fellow of New College, Oxford and appointed a college tutor in French. From 1987 to 2006, she was also a lecturer in French in the Faculty of Medieval and Modern Languages of the University of Oxford. In 2006, she was appointed professor of French literature by the University of Oxford. In 2015, she retired from full-time academia and was appointed an emeritus fellow of New College.

Outside of Oxford, Jefferson has held a number of visiting scholar appointments. In 2006, she was a visiting professor at Columbia University in the United States. In 2008, she was a visiting professor at the Sorbonne in Parish, France. From February 2016 to June 2016, she was a fellow of the Institut d'études avancées de Paris (Paris Institute for Advanced Study).

Personal life
In 1971, Jefferson married Anthony Glees; they divorced in 1992. Together they had two sons and one daughter. In 2011, she married Michael Holland.

Honours
In 2001, Jefferson was appointed a Member of the Ordre des Palmes Académiques by the French government. In 2004, she was elected a Fellow of the British Academy (FBA), the United Kingdom's national academy for the humanities and social sciences. In 2012, she was promoted to Commander of the Ordre des Palmes Académiques.

Selected works
  
  
  
  
  
  
  
 
Jefferson, Ann (2020). Nathalie Sarraute: A Life Between. Princeton, NJ: Princeton University Press. Published in French as Nathalie Sarraute. Paris: Flammarion (2019).

References

1949 births
Living people
Historians of French literature
British women historians
British literary historians
British literary critics
British women literary critics
Literary critics of French
Fellows of New College, Oxford
Fellows of the British Academy
Commandeurs of the Ordre des Palmes Académiques
Alumni of St Anne's College, Oxford
Alumni of Wolfson College, Oxford
Fellows of St John's College, Oxford
Place of birth missing (living people)